Sri Chand (8 September 1494 – 13 January 1629, Gurmukhi: ਸ੍ਰੀ ਚੰਦ), also referred to as Baba Sri Chandra or Bhagwan Sri Chandra, was the founder of the Udasi sect of ascetic Sadhus.

Early life 
He was the eldest son of Guru Nanak, the first Guru and founder of Sikhism. He was born to Mata Sulakhani on Bhadra sudi 9, 1551 Bikrami (i.e. 8 September 1494). Sikh sources give his life the impressive dates of 8 September 1494 – 13 January 1629, which would have made him 134 years old upon his death.

Relationship with Sikh Gurus
It is believed that Sri Chand rejected Angad as the successor to his father. When the Sikh guruship passed from Nanak to Angad, the sons of Nanak, Sri Chand and Lakhmi Das, made a legal claim to their father's properties in Kartarpur, forcing Guru Angad to reestablish the early Sikh community's centre at his native village of Khadur instead.

Guru Amardas declared active and domestic Sikhs to be separate from passive and recluse Udasins.

However the Sikh Gurus, Guru Amardas, Guru Ramdas, Guru Arjan and Guru Hargobind  who were contemporaries of Sri Chand held him in high esteem due to his descent, old age and piety.

Guru Hargobind's eldest son, Baba Gurditta, was given to the Udasins at the behest of Baba Sri Chand and Baba Gurditta eventually replaced Baba Sri Chand as head of the Udasins after his death. Baba Gurditta was the father of Guru Hari Rai, the grandfather of Guru Hari Krishan, and the elder half-brother of Guru Tegh Bahadur.

Ram Rai, son of Guru Har Rai joined the Udasin sect after a failed attempt of being an official eighth Guru of the Sikhs.

Influence

Composing Aarta
Sri Chand wrote Aarta, his most important writing, in praise of his father, Guru Nanak, and presented it to him after one of the Udasins. This writing had a major influence on people of that time who did not know about Guru Nanak yet.

Akharas
Sri Chand established many akharas, some of them being Akhil Bharatiya Akhara Parishad and Shree Panchayati Akhada Bada Udasin.

Possible contribution to the Adi Granth 

According to a sakhi, when Guru Arjan had finished composing sixteen astpadis (cantos) of the Gauri Sukhmani composition, popularly known as Sukhmani Sahib, Sri Chand visited him. During this visit, it is said that Guru Arjan requested him to continue the composition he was compiling and complete the seventeenth canto of the Sukhmani Sahib. Sri Chand humbly recited the verse of his father following the Mul Mantar in the Japji Sahib. Thus, it became the seventeenth canto of the Sukhmani Sahib.

Gallery

References

Bibliography
 

Family members of the Sikh gurus
Punjabi people
1494 births
1629 deaths
16th-century Indian people
People from Kapurthala district
History of Sikhism
Ascetics